Heteracanthia is a genus of flies in the family Stratiomyidae.

Species
Heteracanthia mexicana Giglio-Tos, 1891
Heteracanthia ruficornis Macquart, 1850
Heteracanthia violaceiventris Enderlein, 1921

References

Stratiomyidae
Brachycera genera
Taxa named by Pierre-Justin-Marie Macquart
Diptera of North America
Diptera of South America